STS-48 was a Space Shuttle mission that launched on September 12, 1991, from Kennedy Space Center, Florida. The primary payload was the Upper Atmosphere Research Satellite (UARS). The mission landed on September 18 at 12:38 a.m. EDT at Edwards Air Force Base on runway 22. The mission was completed in 81 revolutions of the Earth and traveled . The 5 astronauts carried out a number of experiments and deployed several satellites.

Crew

Crew seating arrangements

Mission highlights 

Space Shuttle Discovery was launched into a 57.00° inclination orbit from the Kennedy Space Center (KSC) Launch Complex 39A at 7:11 p.m. EDT on September 12, 1991. Launch was delayed for 14 minutes at the T-5 minute mark due to a noise problem in the air-to-ground link. The noise cleared itself, and the countdown proceeded normally to launch.

The UARS mission objectives were to provide an increased understanding of the energy input into the upper atmosphere, global photochemistry of the upper atmosphere, dynamics of the upper atmosphere, the coupling among these processes, and the coupling between the upper and lower atmosphere. The UARS was the first major flight element of NASA's Mission to Planet Earth, a multi-year global research program that would use ground-based, airborne, and space-based instruments to study the Earth as a complete environmental system. UARS had ten sensing and measuring devices: Cryogenic Limb Array Etalon Spectrometer (CLAES); Improved Stratospheric and Mesospheric Sounder (ISAMS); Microwave Limb Sounder (MLS); Halogen Occultation Experiment (HALOE); High Resolution Doppler Imager (HRDI); Wind Imaging Interferometer (WlNDII); Solar Ultraviolet Spectral Irradiance Monitor (SUSIM); Solar/Stellar Irradiance Comparison Experiment (SOLSTICE); Particle Environment Monitor (PEM) and Active Cavity Radiometer Irradiance Monitor (ACRIM II). UARS's initial 18-month mission was extended several times – it was finally retired after 14 years of service.

Secondary payloads were: Ascent Particle Monitor (APM); Middeck 0-Gravity Dynamics Experiment (MODE); Shuttle Activation Monitor (SAM); Cosmic Ray Effects and Activation Monitor (CREAM); Physiological and Anatomical Rodent Experiment (PARE); Protein Crystal Growth (PCG II-2); Investigations into Polymer Membrane Processing (IPMP); and the Air Force Maui Optical Site (AMOS) experiment.

The flight was the first to test an electronic still camera in space, a modified Nikon NASA F4. Images obtained during the flight were monochrome with 8 bits of digital information per pixel (256 gray levels) and stored on a removable hard disk. The images could be viewed and enhanced on board using a modified lap-top computer before being transmitted to the ground via the orbiter digital downlinks.

STS-48 was the second post-Challenger mission to have Kennedy Space Center as the planned End-Of-Mission landing site, and the first mission to have a planned night landing at KSC. However, due to weather conditions at KSC in Florida, Discovery flew one extra orbit and landed at Edwards Air Force Base, California, at 3:38 a.m. EDT on September 18, 1991. The orbiter returned to KSC on September 26, 1991.

Ice particles 

Video while in orbit on September 15, 1991, shows a flash of light and several objects that appear to be flying in an artificial or controlled fashion. NASA explained the objects as ice particles reacting to engine jets. Philip C. Plait discussed the issue in his book Bad Astronomy, agreeing with NASA. This topic was also discussed in an episode of UFO Hunters.

Wake-up calls 
NASA began a tradition of playing music to astronauts during the Project Gemini, and first used music to wake up a flight crew during Apollo 15. Each track is specially chosen, often by the astronauts' families, and usually has a special meaning to an individual member of the crew, or is applicable to their daily activities.

See also 

 List of human spaceflights
 List of Space Shuttle missions
 Nikon NASA F4
 Outline of space science

References

External links 

 NASA mission summary 
 STS-48 Video Highlights 

Space Shuttle missions
Edwards Air Force Base
Spacecraft launched in 1991